10 Things I Hate About Life is a cancelled and unfinished American romantic comedy film directed and written by Gil Junger and starring Evan Rachel Wood, Thomas McDonell and Billy Campbell. Wood and McDonell's characters meet while attempting suicide and fall in love. While this film is not a direct sequel to Junger's 1999 hit 10 Things I Hate About You, it, too, was a romantic comedy that explored some of the same themes.

Filming began in late 2012, but was interrupted after two months due to management changes at the production company and Wood's pregnancy. In late 2013, production was set to resume, with an estimated wrap date of April 2014, though the filming schedule was delayed indefinitely after Wood's departure. The producers have sued her for $30 million for breach of contract; her lawyers have responded that Wood was never adequately paid for the work she had already done since the production company ran out of money. Some production stills, from approximately 30 minutes of footage, have been released, but  the lawsuit is ongoing and the film is seen as unlikely to ever resume shooting.

Plot

The film begins with Wood and McDonell's characters, both determined to take their own lives, pulling up to a scenic cliff overlooking the ocean. While McDonell takes out a gun and prepares it, Wood drives off the cliff. McDonell is briefly startled, but then continues. As he holds the gun to his head and prepares to fire, Wood, her face covered in white powder from the deployment of her car's airbag, comes up from the cliff and asks "Can I borrow that when you're done?"

McDonell and Wood put off their suicide plans and spend more time together, falling in love and gradually finding in each other a reason to live.

Cast 
 Evan Rachel Wood
 Thomas McDonell
 Billy Campbell
 Élodie Yung
 Ezra Masters

Production 
On May 9, 2012 it was announced that Gil Junger would direct the film from his own script, with Intandem Films and Mad Chance Productions producing the film; Andrew Lazar, who produced the original 10 Things I Hate About You in 1999, would re-assume that role for this film. Vision Films acquired the distribution rights to the film.

Casting 
On May 9, 2012 Hayley Atwell was added to the cast of the film to star as lead. She changed her mind and later in the year, Evan Rachel Wood took the part. On November 30, 2012 Élodie Yung joined to star along with Wood. On January 14, 2013 Billy Campbell also joined the cast of the film.

Filming 
The shooting was set to start in November 2012 in Los Angeles. However, shooting actually commenced a month later, on December 17, 2012, in LA. On January 14, 2013, The Hollywood Reporter reported shooting as still being underway in LA.

However, in late February 2013, it was announced that the film's producer, Gary Smith, was stepping down from his position as CEO of Intandem Films and that filming for 10 Things I Hate About Life was to be put on hold. The company said that this was not because of Smith's departure but rather due to Evan Rachel Wood's pregnancy, and that filming would resume that September or some time in the second half of the year.

In the interim, the producers released a promotional trailer from the existing footage, meant to attract interest from potential investors. Interspersed with the footage are scenes with Junger talking about the film and the money it could make. Also included are scenes of Skylar Grey singing "You Wear Me Out", which Junger cites as a selling point.

After several months of no shooting reports or announcements, on November 7, 2013, it was announced that filming would re-commence after a several-month break on December 11 in and around Los Angeles and Malibu and that it would be wrapped up by April 2014. Vision Films released some photos from the film on November 11, 2013, and reported that about 30 minutes had been completed.

In June 2014, Variety reported that Wood was being sued for $30 million by the producers for allegedly refusing to continue working on the film. Wood's lawyers dismissed the suit as "preposterous" and stated that Wood stopped working on the production after producers failed to pay her.

 it has been reported that the lawsuit has not been resolved, and the film as started will never be completed.

See also

List of abandoned and unfinished films

References

External links 
 

2010s romantic comedy films
2010s unfinished films
American romantic comedy films
Cancelled films
Films directed by Gil Junger
Films shot in Los Angeles
2010s English-language films
Unreleased American films
2010s American films